The Cop is a 1928 American silent drama film directed by Donald Crisp. At the 2nd Academy Awards in 1930, Elliott J. Clawson was nominated for an Academy Award in the category Best Writing (Adapted Screenplay). Prints of the film exist in several film archives including the Library of Congress.

Cast
 William Boyd as Pete Smith
 Alan Hale as Mather
 Jacqueline Logan as Mary Monks
 Robert Armstrong as Scarface Marcas
 Tom Kennedy as Sergeant Coughlin
 Louis Natheaux as Louie
 Philip Sleeman as Lord Courtney (credited as Phil Sleeman)
 Dan Wolheim

References

External links

Still at NYPD in the movies

1928 films
1928 drama films
Silent American drama films
American silent feature films
American black-and-white films
Films directed by Donald Crisp
Pathé Exchange films
1920s American films